USS Zara (SP-133) was a steam yacht that was built in Scotland in 1890, passed through a number of British, Canadian and US owners, and ended up as a passenger steamship in Greece after the First World War. She was renamed several times, becoming Solgar, Electra and finally Zoodohos Pigi. In the latter part of the war she spent a year as an armed yacht in the United States Navy.

Private yacht
Fleming and Ferguson built Zara at Paisley, Scotland, launching her on 3 June 1891. Her first owner was a Peter Coats, who registered her in Glasgow.

At an unknown date one A Edward Tower had acquired Zara and registered her in New York City. By 1902 he had passed her on to an HB Moore, who kept her registered in New York City. By 1910 her owner was a GP Grant in Canada. In 1914 a William W Near acquired the yacht,renamed her Solgar, and registered her in Toronto.

Armed yacht
By 1917 Solgar belonged to a David H Friedman of New York City. On 27 April 1917 the US Navy acquired her from Friedman, changed her name back to Zara, and commissioned her with the pennant number SP-133 at New York City on 22 May 1917.

Assigned to the section patrol in the 3rd Naval District, Zara cruised the waters of Long Island Sound for almost a year. She was decommissioned on 13 April 1918 and offered for sale.

Though her name was struck from the Navy Directory on 1 May 1918, the Navy retained Zara as guard vessel at Whitestone, Queens, New York, near the western entrance to Long Island Sound.

Passenger ship
Zara was sold on 13 September 1919 to Atmoploia Stauroudi of Greece, who converted her into a passenger ship.

References

Department of the Navy: Naval Historical Center: Online Library of Selected Images: Civilian Ships: Zara (Steam Yacht, 1891). Previously named Solgar. Was USS Zara (SP-133) in 1917–1919
NavSource Online: Section Patrol Craft Photo Archive Zara (SP 133)

1891 ships
Passenger ships of Greece
Patrol vessels of the United States Navy
Ships built in Scotland
Steam yachts
Steamships of Canada
Steamships of Greece
Steamships of the United Kingdom
World War I patrol vessels of the United States